Illustrated Life Rhodesia was a fortnightly picture magazine published in Salisbury, Rhodesia, by the Graham Publishing Company, from at least 1968 to at least 1978. Aimed at the white Rhodesian populace, it carried illustrated articles on Rhodesian history as well as on current affairs and prominent local personalities. It was viewed as liberal by some because, under the editorship of Heidi Hull, it was often critical of the Ian Smith government; nevertheless, it published a favourable report on the 'protected villages' scheme introduced by the government.

References

Biweekly magazines
English-language magazines
Magazines established in 1968
Magazines disestablished in 1978
Mass media in Rhodesia